Oscar Llewellyn Wrigley (6 August 1913 – 26 November 1987) was a New Zealand cricketer. He played in four first-class matches for Wellington from 1939 to 1943.

See also
 List of Wellington representative cricketers

References

External links
 

1913 births
1987 deaths
New Zealand cricketers
Wellington cricketers
Cricketers from Wellington City
Royal New Zealand Air Force cricketers